Silvana Chausheva (Bulgarian: Силвана Чаушева, born 19 May 1995) is a Bulgarian volleyball player, playing as an opposite. She is part of the Bulgaria women's national volleyball team, and participated at the 2015 FIVB World Grand Prix. and the 2015 Women's European Volleyball Championship, and 2017 FIVB Volleyball Women's U23 World Championship. 
On club level she plays for VK Maritsa Plovdiv.

Clubs 
  VK Maritsa Plovdiv 2017
  Futura Volley Busto Arsizio 2018
  SC Potsdam 2019

References

External links 

 Player profile, Lego Pallavolo
 Player profile, CEV
 https://www.youtube.com/watch?v=G15fzh6bzy8
 http://www.volleybergamo.it/player/silvana-chausheva/

1995 births
Living people
Bulgarian women's volleyball players
Place of birth missing (living people)
Opposite hitters
Bulgarian expatriates in Italy
Expatriate volleyball players in Italy
Volleyball players at the 2015 European Games
European Games competitors for Bulgaria